Wanted Pandugod (stylized as Wanted PanduGod) is a 2022 Indian Telugu-language comedy film directed by Sreedhar Seepana and features Sunil, Sudigali Sudheer and Deepika Pilli in primary roles. The film was released on 19 August 2022.

Cast 

Sunil as Pandugadu
Sudigali Sudheer
 Deepika Pilli 
Srinivasa Reddy
Vennela Kishore
Vishnu Priya
Saptagiri
Nitya Shetty
Anasuya Bharadwaj
Tanikella Bharani
Aamani
Shakalaka Shankar
Brahmanandam as a doctor
Prudhviraj
Raghu Babu
Ananth Babu
Jagadeesh Prathap Bandari
Vasanthi
Hema

Production 
The film was presented by director K. Raghavendra Rao.

Release and reception 
Wanted Pandugod was released theatrically on 19 August 2022. Post-theatrical streaming rights of the film were acquired by Aha.

A critic from Sakshi praised the film's comedy. Asianet News Telugu gave the film a rating of two-and-a-half out of five stars and wrote that the film can entertain a certain audience. A critic from 123Telugu wrote that "On the whole, Wanted PanduGod is an outdated comedy caper that is loud and has a few jokes that the B and C center audience might enjoy".

References

External links